Golborne is a town in the Metropolitan Borough of Wigan, Greater Manchester, England.  The town, the nearby village of Lowton, and the surrounding countryside contain 13 listed buildings that are recorded in the National Heritage List for England.  Of these, one is listed at Grade II*, the middle of the three grades, and the others are at Grade II, the lowest grade.  The area was largely rural until a cotton mill and a colliery opened in the 19th century.  These have closed and the area now contains distribution warehouses.  The listed buildings include houses and associated structures, farmhouses, farm buildings, a set of stocks, and two churches.


Key

Buildings

References

Citations

Sources

Lists of listed buildings in Greater Manchester